There are over 20,000 Grade II* listed buildings in England. This page is a list of these buildings in the district of Uttlesford in Essex.

Uttlesford

|}

Notes

External links

Lists of Grade II* listed buildings in Essex
 
Uttlesford